Temperamental Artist is a 1920 German silent film directed by Paul Otto and starring Conrad Veidt, Aud Egede-Nissen, and Frida Richard.

Cast

References

Bibliography

External links

1920 films
Films of the Weimar Republic
Films directed by Paul Otto
German silent feature films
German black-and-white films